1100 Millecento (previously The Pointe at Brickell Village) is a high-rise residential building in the Brickell neighborhood of Miami, Florida.

The Pointe was approved by the City of Miami and was scheduled to begin construction in late 2007. The building was planned to rise , with 42 floors. The Pointe at Brickell Village was one of several proposed residential developments during the city's recent "Manhattanization" wave. It was scheduled to be completed by 2009, but was cancelled due to the United States housing market correction.

See also
 List of tallest buildings in Miami

References

External links
 1100 Millecento at Emporis

Residential skyscrapers in Miami
2015 establishments in Florida
Residential buildings completed in 2015
Residential condominiums in Miami